All the World's a Stooge is a 1941 short subject directed by Del Lord starring American slapstick comedy team The Three Stooges (Moe Howard, Larry Fine and Curly Howard). It is the 55th entry in the series released by Columbia Pictures starring the comedians, who released 190 shorts for the studio between 1934 and 1959.

Plot
Wealthy Ajax Bullion (Emory Parnell) is up in arms when his eccentric wife (Lelah Tyler) who's over come with joy informs him that she wants to adopt a refugee, the latest socio-political movement. To top it off, he has a terrible toothache. His wife insists he goes to the dentist so she can prepare the nursery.

The Stooges are window washers who work on a scaffold outside of a tall building. Moe and Larry use a rope to pull a Curly back up to the scaffold. Moe then orders Curly to continue the job. He obliges but throws a bucket of water at an open window, and the water splashes all over the dentist's office. At nearly the same time, the dentist (Richard Fiske) arrives to see the mess. He then leaves after threatening to have them fired. It is then that Moe orders Larry and Curly to dry up the floor.

Mr. Bullion meets the inept window washers (whom he mistakes for interim dentists) when he enters the office demanding medical attention. They knock him out cold when he asks for anesthetic, then attempt to find the bad tooth. After pulling his bridge-work out completely ("you stripped his gears!", Larry comments), they try to put it back into his mouth with cement. However, the cement hardens before they have a chance to put the tooth back in, so they decide to blast. The dentist arrives back in his office as the dynamite is lit. He calls out to the Stooges, who notice him and run off. The dynamite goes off and Mr. Bullion wakes up, noticing that the pain in his tooth is gone. He heads back to his car and notices the Stooges hiding inside. He inquires as to what they are up to, and Moe says that they are "refugees." Mr. Bullion then has a very nasty idea to disabuse his wife of her philanthropic notion: pass these three nitwits off as refugee children.

Mrs. Bullion is naturally thrilled at the sight of the Stooges, who are dressed as toddlers. Moe and Curly are in large sailor suits, while Larry is dressed as a young girl in a dress with a large hair bow. Mr. Bullion calls them Johnny (Moe), Frankie (Curly), and Mabel (Larry). The Stooges then stay with the Bullions until Mrs. Bullion decides to have a party to introduce her wealthy friends to her new refugees.

Mrs. Bullion ends up regretting their adoption during the party in their honor — and Mr. Bullion is beginning to regret concocting this scheme to begin with. The festivities are interrupted when an angered Mr. Bullion chases after the Stooges with an axe out of the house.

Production notes
All the World's a Stooge was the last short to be filmed in 1940. Filmed on August 24–28, 1940, the title of the film parodies William Shakespeare's "All the world's a stage."

Adopting refugees from European countries was a common event amongst society people during World War II.

References

External links
 
 
 All the World's a Stooge at threestooges.net

1941 films
Columbia Pictures short films
The Three Stooges films
American black-and-white films
Films directed by Del Lord
1941 comedy films
American slapstick comedy films
1940s English-language films
1940s American films